Rijeka Dubrovačka (Italian: Val d'Ombla) is a ria (coastal inlet) to the north of Dubrovnik, Croatia, on the coast of the Adriatic Sea. The Ombla river flows into Rijeka Dubrovačka. The Franjo Tuđman Bridge spans it, carrying the D8 state road.

References

External links

Landforms of Dubrovnik-Neretva County
Bodies of water of Croatia
Inlets of Europe